William Boucher may refer to:

Billy Boucher (1899–1958), Canadian hockey player
William Albert Boucher (1889–1976), Canadian parliamentarian from Saskatchewan